Habba is a 1999 Indian Kannada-language drama film written and directed by D. Rajendra Babu. The film has an ensemble cast including Vishnuvardhan, Ambareesh, Devaraj, Jayapradha, Urvashi, Shashikumar, Ramkumar, Vijayalakshmi, Kasthuri and Charulatha. The movie was produced by Bharathi Devi for Chinni Chitra productions. The movie became a blockbuster and ran for more than 25 weeks. The film was remade in Telugu in 2002 as Chandravamsam starring Krishna. The movie was loosely based on the Pandavas's exile episode in the Virata Parva of Mahabharata.

Cast

Awards 
Karnataka State Film Awards 1999-00
 Karnataka State Film Award for Best Screenplay - D. Rajendra Babu

Soundtrack
The music of the film was composed and lyrics were written by Hamsalekha. Popular playback singer Nanditha made her entry into film songs with this soundtrack. The song "Habba Habba" is a slightly modified version of the song "Yele Hombisile" which Hamsalekha had composed for the film Halunda Thavaru. All the songs in the film become chartbusters.

Remake
The movie is remade in Telugu as Chandra Vamsam in 2002.

Reception
The Indian Express called the film "a beautiful mansion without proper foundation". Deccan Herald wrote "this film stands out for its effort to infuse new life into the narration and proceedings."

References

External links
 Habba songs

1999 films
1990s Kannada-language films
Indian drama films
Films scored by Hamsalekha
Kannada films remade in other languages
Films directed by D. Rajendra Babu
1999 drama films

kn:ಹಬ್ಬ